The 1966 Israel Super Cup was the fourth Israel Super Cup, an annual Israeli football match played between the winners of the previous season's Top Division and Israel State Cup. As the match was not set by the Israel Football Association, it was considered an unofficial cup.

The match was played between Hapoel Tel Aviv, champions of the 1965–66 Liga Leumit and Hapoel Haifa, winners of the 1965–66 Israel State Cup. At the match, played at Kiryat Haim Stadium, Hapoel Tel Aviv won 2–1.

Match details

References

1966
Super Cup
Super Cup 1966
Super Cup 1966
Israel Super Cup matches